Alastor pronotalis is a species of wasp in the family Vespidae.

pronotalis